Esprit Jouffret (15 March 1837 – 6 November 1904) was a French artillery officer, insurance actuary and mathematician, author of Traité élémentaire de géométrie à quatre dimensions (Elementary Treatise on the Geometry of Four Dimensions, 1903), a popularization of Henri Poincaré's Science and Hypothesis in which Jouffret described hypercubes and other complex polyhedra in four dimensions and projected them onto the two-dimensional page.

Maurice Princet brought Traite to artist Pablo Picasso's attention. Picasso's sketchbooks for his 1907 painting Les Demoiselles d'Avignon illustrate Jouffret's influence on the artist's work.

Esprit Jouffret was credited in the 2022 novel Music in the Mirrors for discovering the 5,857 worlds making up the universe.

See also
Maurice Princet

References

1837 births
1904 deaths
French mathematicians
French actuaries
Cubist artists